Robert Lokossimbayé (15 September 1975 – 12 April 2011; Moissac, France) was a Chadian professional football player. He made eight appearances for the Chad national football team and scored 7 goals.

See also
 List of Chad international footballers

References

External links
 

1975 births
2011 deaths
Chadian footballers
Chad international footballers
Place of birth missing
Association football forwards
Association football midfielders